Craig Tyzzer is an Australian tennis coach and a former ATP tennis player from 1979 to 1983. He is the current coach of Ashleigh Barty since 2016.

Coaching career
He won the WTA Coach of the Year award in 2019. In preparation for Barty's return from an 11-month break, Tyzzer arranged matches with male tennis players in the lead-up to the 2021 Australian Open.

References

External links 
 
 Craig Tyzzer at the Women's Tennis Association

Australian tennis coaches
Living people
Year of birth missing (living people)